Jared Gold is an American jazz organist who plays the Hammond B-3 organ.

He attended William Paterson University in Wayne, New Jersey. In 1988 he won the Governor's Award for Jazz Performance in New Jersey. He has worked with Ralph Bowen, Benny Golson, Bill Goodwin, Bob Mintzer, Ralph Peterson Jr., Benny Powell, John Swana, and John Webber. Gold has been influenced by Larry Young, Jack McDuff, and Don Patterson.

In 2004, guitarist Dave Stryker included Gold in his trio with drummer Tony Reedus. Gold appeared at Chez Hanny in 2005 with the Dan Pratt Organ Quartet, and in 2007 he toured the UK with the Randy Napoleon Trio. He recorded his first solo album, Solids & Stripes (Posi-Tone, 2008) with Randy Napoleon on guitar, Seamus Blake on tenor saxophone, and Mark Ferber on drums. Gold appears on two albums with Napoleon and drummer Quincy Davis. These are Enjoy the Moment and Randy Napoleon: Between Friends. The first is a collaboration between Gold and Napoleon and prominently features two of Gold's compositions.

Discography
 Solids & Stripes (Posi-Tone, 2008)
 Supersonic (Posi-Tone, 2009)
 Out of Line (Posi-Tone, 2010)
 All Wrapped Up (Posi-Tone, 2011)
 Golden Child (Posi-Tone, 2012) 
 Intuition (Posi-Tone, 2013)
 JG 3+3 (Posi-Tone, 2014)
 Metropolitan Rhythm (Posi-Tone, 2015)
 Reemergence (Strikezone, 2018)

References

External links
 Official website

Living people
Place of birth missing (living people)
Year of birth missing (living people)
American jazz organists
American male organists
21st-century organists
21st-century American male musicians
American male jazz musicians
21st-century American keyboardists
Posi-Tone Records artists